The following radio stations broadcast on AM frequency 1310 kHz: The Federal Communications Commission classifies 1310 AM as a regional frequency.

In Argentina
 LRA42 in Gualeguaychú, Entre Ríos.
 LRG379 in Piedra del Aguila, Neuquén.
 Master in Luján.

In Canada
 CIWW in Ottawa, Ontario - 50 kW, transmitter located at

In Mexico
 XEAM-AM in Matamoros, Tamaulipas
 XEC-AM in Tijuana, Baja California
 XEGRT-AM in Taxco, Guerrero
 XERAM-AM in Betania, Chiapas
 XETIA-AM in Guadalajara, Jalisco
 XEVB-AM in Monterrey, Nuevo León
 XEQRMD-AM in Querétaro, Querétaro

In the United States

References

Lists of radio stations by frequency